is a Japanese composer, arranger, and pianist best known for his work on the soundtracks for films and games.

Early life and education
Yusuke Hatano was born in New Jersey, returned to Japan, and studied high school in Singapore and Malaysia.  During his university life at the University of Queensland in Brisbane, Australia, he won the Percy Brier Memorial Prize with his composition Oriental Isolation. Interested in a range of musical genres – from classical and jazz to contemporary and electronic music – Hatano spent the formative years of his career as a jazz pianist in Brisbane, before relocating to Hong Kong in 2011.

Career
Hatano's film compositions have attracted international attention, with his work for the film Full Strike debuting with a world premiere at the 2015 Osaka Asian Film Festival. Full Strike was the winner of Best Asian Film at the Neuchâtel International Fantastic Film Festival (NIFFF) 2015, and the official selection of Osaka Asian Film Festival 2015 and New York Asian Film Festival 2015. In 2017, Hatano was nominated for the Best Original Music for film "Soul Mate" at the 11th Asian Film Awards, and for the 36th Hong Kong Film Awards, he has been nominated for Best Original Film Song for film "Happiness", Best Original Music for film "Mad World" and Best Original Music for film "Soul Mate".  In this year, Hatano won BEST ORIGINAL MUSIC at the Hong Kong Film Award, Los Angeles Golden Screen Award, and China Hamilton Behind the Scenes Award.

Hatano has written scores for films including "Mad World" directed by Chun Wong starring Eric Tsang and Shawn Yue, Soulmate produced by Peter Chan and Jo Jo Hui, directed by Derek Tsang starring Zhou Dongyu and Sichun Ma, Line Walker directed by Jazz Boon starring Nick Cheung, Louis Koo, Francis Ng, and Charmaine Sheh, Happiness directed by Andy Lo Yiu Fai starring Kara Hui and Carlos Chan which won the Asian CineVision 2016 Asian Media Humanitarian Award in New York as well as Best Actress and Best Supporting Actor at the 7th Macau International Movie Festival, GOOD TAKE! : Cement, GOOD TAKE! : The Banquet, GOOD TAKE! : GOOD TAKE, Full Strike, and Hardcore Comedy: Shocking Wet Dreams.  He is also the composer for the Madhead app game Chronosgate. He has also composed music for pop artists including for Softhard concert promotion, Ken Hung, arranged music for Vivian Chan and AGA.

Performances 
In 2012, Hatano was the featured pianist for charity jazz concert Love Affairs with Jolie. In 2015, he performed Leslie Cheung’s song 你在何地 at the Hong Kong Coliseum with director Derek Kwok at famous lyricist Calvin Poon's "P For Poon Party" Concert.  In 2016, he performed with William So and 為你鍾情 composer Wong Ching Yu for Community Chest on TVB. In October 2016, charity jazz concert "Moments with Anne", with Yusuke Hatano as the director and pianist, had donated over $200,000 to the Community Chest of Hong Kong. As the music director and featured pianist, Yusuke performed for the countdown performance of 2019 to 2020 at MGM Cotai Macau.

Filmography

Games

Works for pop albums 
(In Order of Starting Year of Affiliation)

Awards and nominations

References

External links
 

1986 births
21st-century Japanese male musicians
21st-century Japanese pianists
Japanese film score composers
Japanese male film score composers
Japanese male pianists
Japanese music arrangers
Japanese pianists
Living people